Toavina Hasitiana Rambeloson (born 26 November 1992) is a Malagasy international footballer who plays as a defender for French club Iris Club de Croix.

Career
Born in Mananjary, Rambeloson has played for Ajesaia, Lusitanos Saint-Maur, Red Star B, Tourcoing, Arras and IC Croix.

He made his international debut for Madagascar in 2017.

References

1992 births
Living people
Association football defenders
Malagasy footballers
Ajesaia players
US Lusitanos Saint-Maur players
Red Star F.C. players
US Tourcoing FC players
Arras FA players
Iris Club de Croix players
Championnat National 2 players
Championnat National 3 players
Madagascar international footballers
2019 Africa Cup of Nations players
Malagasy expatriate footballers
Malagasy expatriate sportspeople in France
Expatriate footballers in France